David M. Bailey (February 26, 1966 – October 2, 2010) was an American singer-songwriter. He released over 20 albums between 1997 and 2010, primarily playing acoustic folk.

Biography
David M. Bailey was the son of Presbyterian missionaries and was raised, primarily, in Beirut, Lebanon. He spent the last two years of his high school education in southern Germany (the Black Forest area), where he was prolific in his songwriting and performing.  Upon returning to the United States, he attended Grove City College; he then married Leslie McGarvey and entered corporate America.   He was diagnosed with a Glioblastoma Multiforme IV (GBM 4) brain tumor that was to have killed him in six months.  He quit his corporate job and returned to his love of songwriting and performing.  He toured and performed for a few years in the duo Not by Chance, along with guitarist, vocalist and songwriter Douglas Ebert. The duo eventually dissolved and Bailey toured solo from then on.  In 2003, he was a "New Folk Finalist" at the Kerrville New Folk Competition at the Kerrville Folk Festival. In late 2008, Bailey was diagnosed with a recurrence of glioblastoma.  On November 20, 2008, Bailey had surgery to remove a cyst and new tumor. His trials with the initial occurrence of glioblastoma, and the initial recurrence in 2008, were discussed in Sanjay Gupta's book Cheating Death. On October 2, 2010, Bailey died of brain cancer following a month-long surge during which he was able to visit with family and friends from across the United States.

David performed and provided workshops for christian and cancer conferences nationally and around the world.  He attended the New Wilmington Mission Conference off and on for his entire life and was an Elder in the Presbyterian Church (USA).

Discography
Watermarked'All That MattersBittersweetCoffee with the AngelsComfortFaithHope, the AnthologyLifeLiveLost and FoundLove the TimeOne More DayPeaceRusty Brick RoadSilent ConversationTwo to SeeSome Quiet NightHome By Another WayNotesLove – Still The Greatest''

DVD release
Living

References

External links
David M. Bailey official website
David  M. Bailey on CD Baby

1966 births
2010 deaths
American folk singers
American rock guitarists
American male guitarists
American male singer-songwriters
American rock singers
American male pop singers
American Presbyterians
American rock songwriters
Singer-songwriters from Virginia
Grove City College alumni
Musicians from Beirut
American performers of Christian music
Guitarists from Virginia
20th-century American guitarists
20th-century American male musicians